The following is a list of characters that first appeared in the British soap opera EastEnders in 2021, by order of first appearance. All characters are introduced by the show's senior executive producer, Kate Oates, and executive producer, Jon Sen. The first character to be introduced in 2021 is Caleb Malone (Ben Freeman), who joined as part of a storyline involving Chelsea Fox (Zaraah Abrahams) and Lucas Johnson (Don Gilet). Zack Hudson (James Farrar) made his debut in March, followed by Dana Monroe (Barbara Smith) and Estelle Jones (Sue Holderness) in April. Violet Highway was then introduced (Gwen Taylor) in May. Tom "Rocky" Cotton (Brian Conley) made his first appearance in May pretending to be Terry Cant, the father of Sonia Jackson (Natalie Cassidy); he is later confirmed to be the father of Dotty Cotton (Milly Zero). Dani Dyer guest-starred as Jeanette in June and Harvey Monroe (Ross Boatman) made his debut in July. Kate Robbins was then cast in the guest role of music agent Jen Glover, making her first appearance in August. In October, Delroy Atkinson, Charlie Wernham and Heather Peace made their debuts as Howie Danes, Aaron Monroe and Eve Unwin, respectively, as well as Alyssa, the child of Jada Lennox (Kelsey Calladine-Smith) and Dennis Rickman (Bleu Landau). Additionally, multiple other characters appear throughout the year.

Caleb Malone

Caleb Malone, played by Ben Freeman, first appears in episode 6209, originally broadcast on 25 January 2021. The character and Freeman's casting details were announced on 12 January 2021. Caleb is introduced as part of a story with Chelsea Fox (Zaraah Abrahams) and her father, Lucas Johnson (Don Gilet), although details regarding the story were embargoed. Rianne Houghton from Digital Spy suggested that Caleb could be involved in Chelsea's plot against her father. Freeman was contracted for multiple episodes, appearing in a small stint. A Heart reporter called Caleb "a very mysterious new character". The character departs in episode 6238, originally broadcast on 16 March 2021.

Caleb arrives in Walford to meet Chelsea, having spoken previously on the phone about a "job" in which Cheslea is using Lucas as a "courier". Caleb comments to Chelsea that her clothes appear expensive so she clearly knows how to spend the money she took from him. She insists he will get it back and he says to make sure nothing goes wrong, making a veiled threat towards her.

Zack Hudson

Zack Hudson, played by James Farrar, first appears in episode 6237, originally broadcast on 16 March 2021. The character and Farrar's casting details were announced on 31 January 2021. Zack is introduced as the son of Gavin Sullivan (Paul Nicholas) and half-brother of established character Sharon Watts (Letitia Dean), although this is embargoed until his first appearance. The character is billed as a "unpredictable troublemaker who lives life in the fast lane". He is described as "forever the ladies' man" and Jon Sen, the show's executive producer, called him a "charming rogue". Farrar noted that Zack becomes a "heartthrob" who causes tension with the Carter family. The character's backstory states that he experienced a challenging childhood which gave him attachment issues and turned him into a "lone wolf". Farrar expressed his delight at joining EastEnders and hoped to bring his experience as "a born and bred Londoner" to the role. He liked Zack's backstory and commented, "there is a real depth to him that I can't wait to explore." He found the role of Zack different to other roles he has portrayed. Sen dubbed Farrar "a wonderful addition" and teased that "trouble is always just round the corner" for Zack.

Farrar began filming in February 2021, while the show was produced under socially distanced filming restrictions. Consequently, his wife was hired to be a stand-in for any scenes requiring actors to be closer than two metres. Zack is introduced to the soap at Gavin's funeral, where he makes a "scathing toast" and is chased out by Gavin's cousins. He catches up with Sharon and Kathy Beale (Gillian Taylforth) afterwards, where he reveals he is Gavin's son. Zack later visits Albert Square, where Sharon lives, to build a relationship with her. Farrar explained that Zack wants to support Sharon, which he related to, having come from a family of "very strong women". However, Zack struggles not to cause problems for them. Farrar confirmed that he had been involved in five stunts in his first few weeks of filming.

In January 2023, it was announced that Zack would be at the centre of an issue-led storyline when he discovered that he was HIV-positive. The storyline begins when a face from Zack's past, Brett Nelson, played by former Hollyoaks actor Fabrizio Santino, arrives in Walford in search of employment at the local gym. On the storyline, executive producer Chris Clenshaw addressed, "EastEnders has never shied away from covering sensitive issues and Zack's story is one of these. There are so many myths and disinformation surrounding HIV, so working closely with Terrence Higgins Trust has enabled us to really understand what it is like for those that are diagnosed with HIV and we hope that this storyline will bring more awareness of HIV and what it is like to live with the virus in 2023". The storyline also covers HIV and pregnancy, as Zack is diagnosed with the virus shortly after impregnating Whitney Dean (Shona McGarty). On this, Dr. Kate Nembiar from Terrence Higgins Trust added, "All pregnant people are offered an HIV test to reduce the number of babies born with the virus. Thanks to this and the incredible treatment advances, vertical HIV transmission rarely happens in the UK now. People living with HIV do give birth to HIV negative children. If someone who is pregnant tests positive for HIV, they'll be advised to start treatment straight away. This is a crucial way to prevent the virus being transmitted to the baby during pregnancy or birth."

Zack attends Gavin's cremation and at the wake, he raises a scathing toast to Gavin and is chased by his cousins. Zack hides out in Kathy and Sharon's car until the coast is clear and when Sharon asks about his identity, he tells her that Gavin was his father. Zack later arrives in Walford after receiving a call from Sharon's friend, Jean Slater (Gillian Wright). He reveals he has nowhere to live and has been sleeping his car. He is then rude to Jay Brown (Jamie Borthwick) and Kheerat Panesar (Jaz Deol). Zack tells Sharon about his abusive childhood with Gavin, detailing how he hit him and Sharon tells him he did the same thing to her son Dennis Rickman Jnr (Bleu Landau). Zack then takes Sharon's keys and sneaks into her flat looking for something but is caught by Sharon. Zack tells her that he is looking for a safety deposit box, left to Sharon in Gavin's will, which Gavin left him the key for. Sharon accuses Zack of being like Gavin and he says he is nothing like their father. They then agree to share whatever is in the box. Zack opens it and is enraged to find a birthday card he made for Gavin as a child and little else of value. He throws the box on the floor, frightening Sharon. Zack tells Sharon about a time when he baked Gavin some cakes at school but he was unappreciative and stubbed out his cigarette in one, leaving him humiliated. As he goes to leave, Sharon tells him that Dennis died the previous year and asks Zack to stay, to which he initially refuses, although returns later with food and wine for them both. Zack finds himself on the wrong side of Martin Fowler (James Bye), who punches him when he believes that he has been sleeping with his wife Ruby Allen (Louisa Lytton). He later becomes friends with Martin and starts working as a barman at the Queen Victoria public house. 

Zack starts dating Nancy Carter (Maddy Hill) and also flirts with her half-sister Frankie Lewis (Rose Ayling-Ellis). He gives Frankie driving lessons and in one of the lessons, he stops off at the Queen Vic to have a drink and continues. Zack resumes flirting with Frankie and winds her up, causing her to take her eyes off the road. They are involved in a hit-and-run accident, in which Nancy gets hit by the car. Zack persuades Frankie to cover up the accident but it proves too daunting for her and she confesses to Nancy’s father Mick (Danny Dyer). Mick agrees to hide it from Nancy and warns Zack away. However he cannot resist and continues to see Nancy, keeping it a secret from Mick. Whilst upstairs in The Queen Vic, Nancy's mother Linda (Kellie Bright) is threatened by burglars who attempt to steal money, but Zack stands up to them and they leave. Mick discovers that Zack is sleeping with Nancy, but he ignores Mick’s threats to leave her. Zack then admits the truth to Nancy and she subsequently ends their relationship. After this, Zack sleeps with Janine Butcher (Charlie Brooks) but realises he loves Nancy and attempts to make amends. When Alyssa is left on Sharon's doorstep, both Zack and Martin believe that they could be her father, however when Alyssa's mother Jada Lennox (Kelsey Calladine-Smith) arrives in Walford, she reveals that Zack's nephew, Dennis, is Alyssa’s father. Jada moves in with Sharon and Zack soon realises that Sharon and her ex-husband Phil Mitchell (Steve McFadden) are planning on battling Jada for custody of Alyssa. He tells Jada and she flees with Alyssa. When Sharon finds out that Zack told Jada about her intentions, she evicts him and he is left homeless. He manages to find Jada and convinces her to return with Alyssa, and they all move into 43 Albert Square with Sharon.

Zack builds his relationship with Nancy, and she supports him when he has the opportunity to participate in a cooking competition, letting him use The Queen Vic's kitchen for practice. They grow closer and resume their relationship. He supports Nancy when she learns that her aunt Tina Carter (Luisa Bradshaw-White) – who is thought to have been on the run – has been murdered by Gray Atkins (Toby-Alexander Smith). Zack and Nancy decide to open a restaurant together, and they meet with Melissa (Hannah Bennett-Fox), who they believe is an investor. Unbeknownst to the both of them, Melissa is working with Janine to swindle the pair, so she can use the money to pay Linda into leaving Walford. Melissa tricks Nancy into transferring money into her account, and they become suspicious when they do not hear back from the investor; they later discover that Nancy has been conned. Zack bonds with Jada and she tries to kiss him, but Zack rebuffs her advances. She lies to Sharon that Zack tried to kiss her, and Sharon threatens to throw Zack out in order for Jada to admit the truth. Jada later admits to Sharon that she lied. During a stormy time with Nancy, Zack drowns his sorrows at the club, where he sleeps with Sam Mitchell (Kim Medcalf). Nancy finds out and after much consideration, she decides to make a fresh start by leaving Walford without Zack, thus ending their relationship. Soon after, Zack and Sam begin a fling and when Sam’s ex-boyfriend Don (Nick Nevern) arrives in Walford, she claims that she is pregnant with Zack’s child. Sam later reveals that she lied to drive Don away, and when she asks Zack to begin a serious relationship, he turns her down. 

Zack becomes close to Whitney Dean (Shona McGarty) and they have a one-night stand. Zack is surprised when Whitney reveals that she is pregnant. At first, Zack does not want to become a father due to his bad experiences with Gavin as a child, but changes his mind, and agrees to support her. He contemplates taking a job as a chef on a cruise ship, but decides to stay when Whitney's friend Chelsea Fox (Zaraah Abrahams) tells him that Whitney needs him to be around. Zack's former friend Brett Nelson (Fabrizio Santino) arrives in Walford and applies to become a personal trainer at Sharon's gym. Zack is wary of Brett and reveals to Sharon that Brett had previously introduced him to steroids in the past, which led him to be violent and aggressive. Zack tries to warn Brett away but he returns and reveals to Zack that he may have HIV after they shared a needle whilst taking steroids. Zack becomes depressed and pushes Whitney away and tells her that he wants nothing to do with their child. He begins drinking heavily and smashes Peggy's Bar, cutting his hand in the process. After messing up an opportunity to become a head chef at Walford East, he sees Brett who encourages him to get checked at a sexual health clinic. Zack begrudgingly gets himself checked, and is mortified to discover that he is HIV positive. He tells Brett that he is worried that he may have passed it on to his unborn child. He decides to tell Whitney but is relieved when she reveals that her blood test has been fine. Zack later gives the clinic a list of all the women that he has slept with and they contact them to get checked.

Dana Monroe

Dana Monroe (initially credited as Dana Adams), played by Barbara Smith, first appear in episode 6247, originally broadcast on 1 April 2021. She is introduced as a love interest for Bobby Beale (Clay Milner Russell), who meets her under a false alias. Smith previously appeared on EastEnders in 2019 as Ellie. Smith auditioned for the role of Dana over Zoom due to the impact of the COVID-19 pandemic on television and despite thinking that she had not performed well, Smith was cast as Dana. She was initially cast in a 6-month guest stint, but was promoted to a regular cast member and had her family introduced to the soap. Dana has been shown to be a bubbly and likeable character and critics have noted that it has been refreshing to have a character with good intentions on EastEnders.

As well as her on-off relationship with Bobby, her tumultuous relationships with her relatives have been central to Dana's storylines. Father Harvey Monroe (Ross Boatman) is shown to be a strict father to Dana and attempts to control her, while brother Aaron Monroe (Charlie Wernham) disgusts Dana with his racist and Islamophobic attitudes. Smith noted that despite Dana being at the bottom of the Monroe family's power hierarchy, it would not stop her from attempting to change their family's old-fashioned mindsets. Smith's departure was announced in June 2022, having been written out by new executive producer Chris Clenshaw. Dana made her departure in episode 6549, originally broadcast on 1 September 2022. The character's relationship with Bobby has been well received by viewers and critics, with one of their scenes nominated for Feel Good Moment at the 2021 Inside Soap Awards. Smith was also nominated in the newcomer categories at the 2021 I Talk Telly Awards and the Digital Spy Reader Awards for her portrayal of Dana.

Estelle Jones

Estelle Jones, played by Sue Holderness, first appears in episode 6261, originally broadcast on 26 April 2021. The character and Holderness' casting details were announced on 26 March 2021. Holderness was contracted for a guest stint and appears in four episodes. The actress expressed her delight at her casting and found filming on the EastEnders set a "surreal" experience. EastEnders marks Holderness' first time filming a soap. Estelle is introduced as a love interest for Billy Mitchell (Perry Fenwick). Holderness described her character as "a good time girl" who adopts a carefree attitude to money and enjoys "fine dining". The character is a theatrical agent who works with children. She arrives for a photoshoot with Billy's daughter, Janet Mitchell (Grace). Estelle meets Billy and becomes "very intrigued" by him. Holderness did not think that Estelle and Billy were well suited, but felt Billy needed "some fun in his life". Estelle departs in episode 6264, originally broadcast on 30 April 2021. Holderness expressed an interest in reprising the role again.

Estelle is theatrical agent who Billy meets at when dropping his daughter Janet off for a photoshoot. They go on a date and Estelle asks Janet's mother and Billy's ex-wife, Honey Mitchell (Emma Barton), if she is okay with them dating. Honey approves but is upset to learn that Estelle is paying Janet less than the other children, believing it to be because Janet has Down syndrome. Estelle states that this isn't the case and that she is paid less because of her inexperience. Estelle goes on another date with Billy and Honey appears, refusing to take Janet to any more photoshoots.

Vi Highway 

Violet "Vi" Highway, played by Gwen Taylor, first appears in episode 6265, originally broadcast on 3 May 2021. The character and Taylor's casting details were announced on 17 March 2021. Vi is billed as the "quick-witted and blunt" grandmother of established characters Callum Highway (Tony Clay) and Stuart Highway (Ricky Champ). She is described as a "steely" and dependable woman with a "very warm heart" deep down. Taylor characterised Vi as "sharp but honest" and said that she places importance on her family. Johnathon Hughes from the Radio Times dubbed Vi a "plucky pensioner" who is "no-nonsense, takes no prisoners and has absolutely no filter".

When developing the character, Taylor took inspiration from her own mother who would regularly share her opinions. Hughes felt that Vi could fill the void of the "cockney matriarch" missing from the show. Taylor liked the idea of developing Vi into this character and hoped writers would explore this. Taylor first auditioned for EastEnders in 1984 for one of the show's original characters, but was rejected due to not being from the area. Jon Sen, the show's executive producer, was pleased with Taylor's casting, calling her "the perfect actress to play the multi-faceted Violet Highway".

The character is introduced in the build up to Callum's wedding to Ben Mitchell (Max Bowden). She arrives after Ben informs her about the wedding and when she meets him, Vi warns Ben that Callum was a good person until he met Ben. Vi then arranges a chat with Ben's father, Phil Mitchell (Steve McFadden); Taylor explained that Vi is not in "fighting mode" when she meets Phil, which meant he did not need to fear her. The actress enjoyed working with McFadden, who helped her adjust to the filming schedule. Sen teased that Vi is "a grandmother not to be messed with", which he said Callum and Stuart would quickly learn. On Vi's relationship with her grandchildren, Taylor commented, "She loves those boys and is incredibly protective of them." In her backstory, Vi spent a lot of time caring for Stuart as a child, but did not do the same with Callum. As a result, she favours Stuart.

Discussing future storylines for her character, Taylor told Hughes that Vi has a secret, which would explain how her life has panned out. She wanted the character to be well-embedded in the show before the secret was explored. The secret was revealed in November 2021 when it emerges Vi has another son, Christopher, who she gave away because she feared she couldn't provide enough support as he has Down syndrome.

Tom "Rocky" Cotton

Tom "Rocky" Cotton, played by Brian Conley, first appears in episode 6670, originally broadcast on 18 May 2021. The character and Conley's casting details were announced on 15 February 2021. The character is introduced as Terry Cant, the father of established character Sonia Fowler (Natalie Cassidy). Whilst the concept of Terry Cant had been referenced since Sonia's introduction, it received more focus in June 2020 when Sonia decides to search for him. The character is billed as the "ultimate people pleaser" and a charmer. His arrival creates "a huge shock" for Sonia, who had given up looking for her father. Conley expressed his delight at joining the cast, calling it "an incredible moment for me". His father was a big fan of EastEnders, so the actor was proud to be a part of the show. Jon Sen, the show's executive producer, thought Conley was the perfect casting for Terry Cant and called him "a talented performer whose charm, wit and charisma are exactly the qualities we want for Terry".

Producers plotted a twist in the character's story when it is revealed that he is not Terry Cant, Sonia's father. In reality, he is Tom Cotton, the uncle of Dotty Cotton (Milly Zero), who she introduced to con Sonia out of her inheritance. Conley was informed of his character's real identity when he was cast and explained that the double identity led to the creation of the nickname "Rocky". Over time, Rocky becomes emotionally connected to Sonia and struggles to continue with the plot. He also develops a relationship with Kathy Beale (Gillian Taylforth).

Rocky arrives in Walford and instantly bumps into Rainie Highway (Tanya Franks) after leaving the tube station. He asks her for directions to Albert Square and then arrives at Ruby's, where he charms punters with stories. Sonia walks into the club and argues with Dotty Cotton (Milly Zero) and comes face with Rocky but is unaware of who he is and leaves after labelling him a pervert. Rocky then arrives at The Queen Vic looking for Sonia, who hides from him but he finds her and introduces himself as her father, confirming that he received a letter that she had sent to him. After Sonia tells Rocky that her mother, Carol Jackson (Lindsey Coulson) told her that he had walked out on them, Rocky tells Sonia that he loved Carol and says they would have remained together, if it had not been for Carol's next partner Alan Jackson (Howard Antony). He asks Sonia to have a drink with him, which she agrees to and recognises Carol's brother, Jack Branning (Scott Maslen). Rocky tries to build bridges but Sonia is unwilling to.

Jeanette

Jeanette, played by Dani Dyer, appears in episode 6289, originally broadcast on 15 June 2021. The character and Dyer's casting details were announced on 5 May 2021. Jeanette is introduced as a pregnant taxicab driver who drives Mick Carter, portrayed by her real-life father Danny Dyer, to his wife's baby scan appointment. Dyer was contracted for a cameo appearance in one episode. She enjoyed filming with her father and admitted that he would try making her laugh during filming. For the role of Jeanette, Dyer had to learn how to drive a taxi. She admitted to not being a confident driver, so she did test runs before filming. While taxiing Mick, Jeanette's waters break and he has to help her give birth. Dyer initially researched how to act pregnant, before deciding to use her own experiences when portraying the character. She also had to wear a fake baby bump, which she enjoyed.

Jeanette is flagged down by Mick after his car suffers a flat tyre in his attempts to get to the hospital where his wife Linda Carter (Kellie Bright) is having a baby scan. Jeanette is heavily pregnant herself, and when they stop for her to use the loo, her waters break. She panics as her partner is away, but Mick takes charge of the situation and drives her to the hospital. Once there, she pleads with Mick not to leave her, calling him her guardian angel (something which Mick called her when they first met), and Mick accompanies her as she has the baby. She gives birth to a boy, who she names Michael.

Harvey Monroe

Harvey Monroe, played by Ross Boatman, first appears in episode 6311, originally broadcast on 22 July 2021. The character and Boatman's casting details were announced on 9 June 2021. Harvey is introduced as the father of newcomer Dana Monroe (Barbara Smith), who is in a relationship with Bobby Beale (Clay Milner Russell). He is billed as "traditional and a real family man". Boatman described him as "an old-school East Ender with traditional values". Harvey is a taxi driver. The character's backstory states that he was brought up in Bow, London and has raised Dana on his own. Subsequently, they have a close relationship.

Boatman had long dreamt of joining EastEnders, so when he learnt about the role of Harvey, he became determined to win the part. Due to social distancing restrictions, the actor had to record his audition; he spent two days recording the audition and estimated that he rehearsed "about 20 times" for each scene. He admitted to being nervous about his first day on-set, despite his long career. Boatman felt "blessed" to join the cast of a show he has dreamed of joining. Jon Sen, the show's executive producer, called Boatman "perfect to play the affable father to Dana" and thought the character would "shake up the Beale family dynamics".

Producers gave the character a home on Albert Square, the show's setting, and a job as a taxi driver at the local taxi firm. Boatman was excited about the developments and commented, "it feels solid. I can't tell you how exciting it is - I feel fantastic". The actor explained that Harvey is "excited" to move closer to Dana and thought it was "a new beginning for them both". Writers used Harvey's arrival as an obstacle in Dana and Bobby's new relationship. Harvey is initially delighted with Dana's new relationship, but does not realise that Dana is not telling the truth about Bobby. Boatman noted that his character thinks "Bobby is a keeper". During the moving process, Harvey learns that Bobby killed his sister as a child. Boatman explained that Harvey feels understandably "alarmed" and "worried" about Dana's safety and related to the situation as he has a daughter of a similar age to Dana. He used his experience as a father to develop his character and thought it was realistic for Harvey to be "interfering". Boatman enjoyed working with Smith and Milner Russell, who he praised.

A friendship is soon formed between Harvey and Tom "Rocky" Cotton (Brian Conley), after Rocky tells Harvey about Bobby's past. Boatman told Alice Penwill of Inside Soap that Harvey sees Rocky as a "really nice guy, almost a kindred spirit on the Square", but warned that his character perhaps should not trust Rocky. Boatman liked the friendship and wanted it to be explored further, as he enjoyed working with Conley. The Monroe family were developed in October 2021 through the introduction of Harvey's eldest son Aaron Monroe (Charlie Wernham). Harvey and Aaron have a close relationship. The introduction of Aaron solidified the family as a new unit within the soap, with connections to the Beale family through Dana and Bobby's relationship. For his portrayal of Harvey, Boatman won the Best Newcomer award at the 2022 British Soap Awards.

Jen Glover
Jen Glover, played by Kate Robbins, first appears in episode 6319, originally broadcast on 5 August 2021. The character and Robbins' casting details were announced on 11 July 2021. Jen is introduced as the music agent friend of Terry "Rocky" Cant (Brian Conley). She is billed as "no-nonsense" and an "old-school rocker". Jen arrives to work with singer Whitney Dean (Shona McGarty) on the recommendation of Rocky and becomes "determined" to make Whitney famous. Robbins was contracted to the soap for a guest role. The actress expressed her joy at appearing in EastEnders and called it "a dream".

Howie Danes

Howie Danes, portrayed by Delroy Atkinson, first appears in episode 6357, originally broadcast on 11 October 2021. The character was first publicised in advanced spoilers released on 4 October 2021, where he was named Vince Hubbard. Howie is introduced as part of a story exploring the disappearance of established character Vincent Hubbard (Richard Blackwood) as his wife, Kim Fox (Tameka Empson), searches for him. The character is a children's entertainer and had been using Vincent's identity. Atkinson described his character as vulnerable, which he thought was "refreshing".

Writers then integrated Howie into the Fox-Trueman family unit by developing a romance between him and Kim. Atkinson was pleased to be involved in the group and liked working with Empson, Diane Parish (Denise Fox) and Scott Maslen (Jack Branning). Howie's son, Denzel Danes (Jaden Ladega), was introduced in August 2022. Atkinson thought it would be interesting to see how Howie responds to being a parent and could offer a deeper exploration of the character. For his portrayal of Howie, Atkinson was nominated for Best Newcomer at the 2022 Inside Soap Awards.

Kim overhears Mitch Baker (Roger Griffiths) cab booking for someone using the name "Vince Hubbard" and decides to investigate it as she believes it is her husband, Vincent. She traces the booking to Walford East restaurant, where she finds children's entertainer Howie. He reveals that he was a security guard at a junkyard and found Vincent's wallet. Kim learns that Vincent is dead and pleads with Howie to accompany her to report his death to the police. Phil Mitchell (Steve McFadden) realises their plan and scares Howie away, leaving Kim devastated. Kim later visits the junkyard to seek answers and spots Howie, who explains that Phil threatened him. At Christmas, Howie visits Kim with presents for her children and agrees to join Kim in reporting Vincent's death.

He then returns to help Kim film a scholarship video for her daughter, Pearl Fox (Arayah Harris-Buckle). Howie decides to change the video without Kim's permission and she orders him to leave. She comes around when Pearl gets the scholarship. Kim assumes that Howie is gay and does not realise that he has feelings for her; she sets up him on a date with another man until Howie confesses his feelings. Kim is initially not keen on a relationship with Howie and he leaves. However, when Howie injures his leg, Kim decides to help him and invites Howie to move in with her at 20 Albert Square. Howie struggles with Kim's eagernesses to help and decides to move back home to Walford Towers after recovering. Kim drops a bag on his leg resulting in him staying longer. Howie pursues a relationship with Kim once again and they start dating. 

Howie starts receiving phone calls from an unknown person and he tells the caller that he loves them.  He meets with a woman, Delilah (Chereen Buckley), who is revealed to be his ex-girlfriend and mother to his son Denzel. She leaves Denzel to stay with Howie and Kim and they struggle to bond together. Denzel causes trouble and when Amy Mitchell (Ellie Dadd) collapses after taking drugs, Denzel is accused of providing her with the drugs until Lily Slater (Lilia Turner) admits the truth.

Aaron Monroe

Aaron Monroe, played by Charlie Wernham, first appears in episode 6363, originally broadcast on 21 October 2021. The character and Wernham's casting details were announced on 9 August 2021. Aaron is introduced as the eldest son of Harvey Monroe (Ross Boatman) and brother of Dana Monroe (Barbara Smith). The character's introduction establishes the family as a new unit in the show, with connections to the Beale family through Dana's relationship with Bobby Beale (Clay Milner Russell). The character is billed as "a confident and fiercely loyal individual". He is described as a "wayward son". Aaron's backstory states that he was raised by Harvey, who he shares a close relationship with, and left home as soon as he got a job in finance in inner-city London. Wernham expressed his happiness at being cast and called joining the soap "a childhood dream". Jon Sen, the show's executive producer, was pleased with Wernham's casting and teased that there is "more to Aaron than his bravado lets on".

The character arrives to visit his family in their new home and quickly decides to stay in Walford. Aaron has a "strained" relationship with Dana, who feels isolated from Aaron. Sen called Aaron the "opposite" of Dana and teased that their differences would test Aaron and Dana's respective relationships with Harvey. Producers used the characters of Aaron to explore racism and religious hatred, and far-right radicalisation. Thomas Coombes was cast as Neil, the leader of the far-right group, who encourages Aaron's involvement in a terrorist attack. To accurately portray the story, the show's story team worked with Nigel Bromage, the founder of Exit UK, and a team of former far-right members. Sen wanted to explore the issue in a different way, by telling the story through "a family who have an extremist in their midst". Wernham departed the series at the conclusion of the story, as confirmed on 8 June 2022. Aaron's final scenes feature in episode 6475, originally broadcast on 26 April 2022.

Eve Unwin

Eve Unwin, played by Heather Peace, first appears in episode 6369, originally broadcast on 29 October 2021. The character and Peace's casting details were announced on 29 August 2021. Eve is introduced as the cellmate and wife of established character Stacey Slater (Lacey Turner), who recently returned to the show. The character is billed as "tough-as-nails" and Peace described her character as "tough, but fair; super bright and cheeky". She dubbed her a "loveable and quick-witted" woman with a short temper. The actress thought that any of Eve's illegal and immoral behaviour is often justified and understandable. Turner called Eve "hot-headed". The character, like Peace, is a member of the LGBT community. The actress was proud to create representation of the community on the soap. Peace expressed her delight at joining the cast and enjoyed working opposite Turner. On Peace's casting as Eve, Sen commented, "Heather brings the perfect amount of boldness and wit to the role".

The character's backstory states that she was imprisoned for a short sentence but it was repeatedly extended after committing crimes in prison. She then met Stacey in prison and they became friends, marrying to secure a permanent residence for Eve. Jon Sen, the show's executive producer, explained that Eve and Stacey share a "very unique friendship", stemming from their shared prison experience. Turner told Sophie Dainty from Digital Spy that Eve and Stacey have "a great chemistry", reflected in her working relationship with Peace. The friendship between Eve and Stacey was tested by Stacey's mother, Jean Slater (Gillian Wright). Kate Oates, the show's senior executive producer, explained that Jean thinks Eve will create trouble for Stacey. She teased that Jean may go to "extreme" lengths to protect Stacey from Eve.

Jada Lennox

Jada Lennox, played by Kelsey Calladine-Smith, first appears on episode 6373, originally broadcast on 8 November 2021. The character and Calladine-Smith's casting was first publicised in advanced spoilers released on 2 November 2021. Jada is introduced as the mother of 1-year-old Alyssa, who was left on the doorstep of 29 Albert Square in earlier episodes. This sparked a new story as Zack Hudson (James Farrar) and Martin Fowler (James Bye) were considered as possible fathers. The character's arrival reveals the truth: established character Sharon Watts (Letitia Dean), Zack's half-sister, is the grandmother of Alyssa, via her dead son Dennis Rickman (Bleu Landau).

On 10 June 2022, the character's departure was announced, having been written out alongside three other characters by new executive producer Chris Clenshaw. A show insider explained that the decision was part of "a creative decision" from Clenshaw, who wanted to "take the show back to its roots". Calladine-Smith reflected on her tenure in a social media post, commenting, "My EastEnders experience has brought me nothing but smiles". The character departs after being blackmailed by Janine Butcher (Charlie Brooks) into framing Linda Carter (Kellie Bright) and having her daughter, Annie Carter, removed from her care. Jada exits in episode 6548, originally broadcast on 31 August 2022. Calladine-Smith's return was confirmed on 13 December 2022; Jada returns during the show's Christmas episodes as part of the conclusion to Janine's story. Brooks explained that Jada's return would cause "shock and fear" for Janine. The character appears in episode 6614/6615, originally broadcast on 25 December 2022.

Jada first appears whilst watching Alyssa from a distance. When Alyssa drops her teddy, Jada keeps it and tries to leave it on Sharon's doorstep. Zack notices her and when she tries to run, she is chased by Zack and Sharon. Jada reveals that she is Alyssa's mother and that Sharon's deceased son, Dennis, is Alyssa's father, but Sharon accuses Jada of lying. When Jada reveals intimate details of Dennis' life, including Sharon's affair with Keanu Taylor (Danny Walters), she comes around and takes Jada in. Sharon later gets a DNA test which proves that Alyssa is Dennis' daughter. Dennis' adoptive father Phil Mitchell (Steve McFadden) believes that Jada is struggling to look after Alyssa and convinces Sharon to go for full custody. Zack overhears their plan and tells Jada, who flees with Alyssa.

Months later, Zack meets her to return Alyssa's toy after seeing them in Bethnal Green. He persuades her to return to Walford, and whilst outside the train station, Jada is inattentive to Alyssa, causing her pram to roll into the path of an oncoming car. Sharon saves her and asks Jada and Alyssa to move in with her, promising to let Jada keep Alyssa. Jada starts working for Denise Fox (Diane Parish) at her salon, Fox & Hair. She befriends Will Mitchell (Freddie Phillips) and bumps into her old friends Chess Newland (Liani Samuel) and Melody Wiles (Niamh Longford). When Sharon decides to go on holiday with her infant son Albie Watts, Chess and Melody plan a party at Sharon's house without Jada's permission. Jada persuades Zack and Martin to leave the house, however, Sonia Fowler (Natalie Cassidy) overhears the music and ends the party after catching Will smoking. Zack and Martin decide to tell Sharon but change their mind. Jada learns that Denise is selling her salon, causing Jada to lose her job. She is comforted by Zack and they spend time together; Jada tries kissing Zack, but he rejects her. Jada lies to Sharon that Zack had kissed her instead, so Sharon decides to evicts him until Jade admits the truth. When Linda buys into the salon, Jada is reemployed. 

When Jada sees Stuart Highway (Ricky Champ) purchasing pills, they have a heart-to heart and he realises his mistake. He asks Jada to dispose of the pills but Denise discovers the pills on Jada, and confiscates them. Lily Slater (Lilia Turner) steals them and gives them to Amy Mitchell (Ellie Dadd), who collapses after taking them. Jada is confronted by residents, including Linda, and she sacks Jada, who struggles to find another job. Janine convinces Jada to help her scheme against Linda, but when Linda rehires her, Jada refuses to help Janine. However, Janine has recorded Jada admitting her intentions for revenge and blackmails her into planting alcohol on Linda and reporting her to Social Services for neglecting and harming her daughter Annie. Jada is guilt-ridden and confesses the truth to Sharon before fleeing Walford with Alyssa. Jada agrees to return for Christmas Day with Alyssa and confesses to Sharon that Janine blackmailed her. Together, they reveal the truth to Linda and Mick Carter (Danny Dyer).

Other characters

References 

EastEnders
2021
, EastEnders